The legislative districts of Lanao del Norte are the representations of the province of Lanao del Norte in the various national legislatures of the Philippines. The province is currently represented in the lower house of the Congress of the Philippines through its first and second congressional districts.

The highly urbanized city of Iligan last formed part of its representation in 2010.

History 

Prior to gaining separate representation, areas now under the jurisdiction of Lanao del Norte were represented under the Department of Mindanao and Sulu (1917–1935) and the historical Lanao Province (1935–1961).

The enactment of Republic Act No. 2228 on 22 May 1959 divided the old Lanao Province into Lanao del Norte and Lanao del Sur, and provided them each with a congressional representative. In accordance with Section 8 of R.A. 2228, the incumbent representative of Lanao Province, Laurentino Badelles, continued to represent both successor provinces until the next general election in 1961. The chartered city of Iligan, despite being enumerated as part of the territory of neither successor province, was designated as Lanao del Norte's seat of provincial government and became part of its congressional representation.

Lanao del Norte was represented in the Interim Batasang Pambansa as part of Region XII from 1978 to 1984. The province returned one representative, elected at large, to the Regular Batasang Pambansa in 1984. Iligan, declared a highly urbanized city in 1983, separately elected its own representative in this election.

Under the new Constitution which was proclaimed on 11 February 1987, Lanao del Norte was once more grouped with Iligan and reapportioned into two congressional districts, which elected their respective members to the restored House of Representatives starting that same year.

The passage of Republic Act No. 9724 on October 20, 2009, segregated the highly urbanized city of Iligan from the first district of Lanao del Norte to form its own congressional district starting in the 2010 elections. Republic Act No. 9774, enacted on November 17, 2009, further reapportioned Lanao del Norte's districts by transferring the municipalities of Baloi, Matungao, Pantar and Tagoloan from the second to the first district. The reconfigured districts elected their representatives beginning in the 2010 elections.

1st District 
Municipalities: Bacolod, Baloi, Baroy, Kauswagan, Kolambugan, Linamon, Maigo, Matungao, Pantar, Tagoloan, Tubod
Population (2015):  295,473

1987–2010 
City: Iligan
Municipalities: Bacolod, Baroy, Kauswagan, Kolambugan, Linamon, Maigo, Tubod

2nd District 
Municipalities: Kapatagan, Lala, Magsaysay, Munai, Nunungan, Pantao Ragat, Poona Piagapo, Salvador, Sapad, Sultan Naga Dimaporo, Tangcal
Population (2015):  380,922

1987–2010 
Municipalities: Baloi, Kapatagan, Lala, Magsaysay, Matungao, Munai, Nunungan, Pantao Ragat, Pantar, Poona Piagapo, Salvador, Sapad, Sultan Naga Dimaporo (Karomatan), Tagoloan, Tangcal

Notes

Lone District (defunct) 
 includes the chartered city of Iligan

At-Large (defunct) 
 excludes the highly urbanized city of Iligan

See also 
Legislative district of Mindanao and Sulu
Legislative district of Lanao
Legislative district of Iligan

References 

Lanao del Norte
Politics of Lanao del Norte